Sinoe capsana is a moth of the family Gelechiidae. It is found in North America, where it has been recorded from southern Florida.

The length of the forewings is 7–8 mm. The forewings are light grey to brown, the costa with three dark brown spots at the base, one-third and two-thirds. The subbasal fascia is dark brown, near the dorsum almost extending one-fourth across the wing. The discal cell has three small dark brown spots and the apical area has a small dark brown spot beyond the discal cell. There are dark brown spots on the dorsum at one-third and two-thirds. The hindwings are light grey to brown. Adults have been recorded on wing from December to July.

Etymology
The species name refers to the Florida CAPS program, which ran a survey for the tomato leaf miner in Florida, which resulted in the discovery of this species.

References

Moths described in 2012
Litini